Niteworks (also known by the Scottish Gaelic Obair Oidhche) is an Electronic Celtic fusion band from the Isle of Skye. The band are known for writing new songs in Gaelic and melding the bagpipes and Gaelic songs such as puirt a beul with techno and house beats.

History
Niteworks came together in early 2008. Shortly after forming, the band won several awards including the Rapal song contest with "Nam Aonar san Fonn". Niteworks' name comes from a sample of an old Gaelic speaker referring to "Obair Oidhche" or Night Work.

Niteworks have covered Runrig's "Chi mi 'n Geamhradh", and actively write songs in both Gaelic and English.

The band had toured across the Scottish music festival circuit, playing at Rockness, Knockengorroch as well as frequent returns to Tartan Heart Festival. They've headlined Hebridean Celtic Festival's Islands Stage in 2011 (described as the "band of the night".), 2012 & 2015 and sold out Glasgow's Oran Mor, in 2012 & 2015, as part of the city's popular Celtic Connections Festival. They also DJ frequently, independently of their live act.

Their debut release Niteworks : Obair Oidhche was released on 15 October 2011. This release has been acclaimed and is attracting a larger fanbase to the group. A regular sight at their gigs is the "One Man Island Raver".

Niteworks launched their long-awaited debut album, NW, in October 2015 with a sold-out gig at Glasgow's SWG3 Warehouse. The album draws further on the band's Skye roots and Gaelic upbringing and is already drawing comparisons to the legendary Martyn Bennett.

The band capped off 2015 by opening the show at the Scottish Trad Music Awards at Dundee's Caird Hall.

In August 2018, Niteworks released their second album Air Fàir an Là which was co-produced with Alex Smoke and included collaborations with other traditional musicians including SIAN, Iain Morrison, Ellen MacDonald (of Sian and Dàimh), Julie Fowlis and Kinnaris Quintet.

In January 2022, Niteworks released their third album A'Ghrian which was shortlisted for the Scottish Album of the Year Award.

Band members

Names also given in Scottish Gaelic:
Innes Strachan, Aonghas Strachan (vocals/keyboards)
Allan MacDonald, Ailean Domhnallach (guitar/bagpipes/keyboards)
Christopher Nicolson, Crisdean MacNeacail (bass guitar)
Ruairidh Graham, Ruairidh Greumach (drums)

Discography

Albums
NW (2015)
Air Fàir an Là (2018)
A' Ghrian (2022)

EPs
Niteworks : Obair Oidhche (2011)

References

External links

Niteworks Website
Niteworks at the Hebridean Celtic Festival
Review of Niteworks performance

Scottish folk musicians
Celtic fusion musicians
Celtic music groups
People from the Isle of Skye
Remixers
Scottish Gaelic music